Alejandro Agustín Peña Montero (born March 8, 1989) is a Uruguayan footballer currently playing for Torque in the Uruguayan Primera División.

International career
Peña has played for the Uruguay under-20 team at the  2009 South American Youth Championship held in Venezuela where he scored a goal against Chile.

Personal life
He is twin brother of Uruguayan footballer Álvaro Enrique Peña and the son of the former Uruguayan international footballer José Enrique Peña.

External links
 
 

1989 births
Living people
Uruguayan footballers
Uruguayan expatriate footballers
Montevideo Wanderers F.C. players
Club Atlético Huracán footballers
El Tanque Sisley players
Atlético Tucumán footballers
Liverpool F.C. (Montevideo) players
Boavista F.C. players
Danubio F.C. players
Montevideo City Torque players
Primeira Liga players
Argentine Primera División players
Expatriate footballers in Argentina
Expatriate footballers in Portugal
Uruguayan expatriate sportspeople in Portugal
Association football defenders